Zhejiang Airlines was an airline based in Jianqiao Airport in Hangzhou, Zhejiang, China. The airline was wholly owned by China National Aviation Holding. During 2004, as part of a consolidation of the Chinese aviation industry, Air China absorbed Zhejiang Airlines and became its Hangzhou base.

Fleet Data
4 - Airbus A319
5 - Airbus A320
3 - Bombardier DHC-8-301 
1 - Tupolev Tu-154M

Accidents and incidents
On November 8, 1993, A Bombardier Dash 8 with 54 passengers and 5 crew members were hijacked to Taiwan, the hijacker sent a note to the flight attendants claiming he has a bomb and demanding to be flown to Taiwan, when it arrived in Taiwan, the hijacker surrender peacefully. The bomb the hijacker was talking about turned out to be two bars of soap wrapped around a newspaper with a wire.

References

External links

Zhejiang Airlines (Archive)
Zhejiang Airlines Former Fleet Detail
Code and Fleet Data
Timetable Images
Incident Report

Defunct airlines of China
Airlines disestablished in 2004
Transport in Zhejiang
History of Zhejiang
Companies based in Hangzhou
Air China
Airlines of China